The DX number was assigned by the International Imaging Industry Association (I3A). It uniquely identifies the type and manufacturer (sensitizer) of a film emulsion. A proprietary list of DX numbers for APS and 135 film was prepared yearly or as needed. (DX Codes for 135-Size Film, 2004, I3A; last edition was from January 2009). The list was available for sale from the I3A.

DX number composition
A DX number has two parts separated by a dash: the "combination code" also known as "DX Number Part 1" followed by a "specifier number", or "DX Number Part 2". For example, Agfa Perutz 3-color ISO 200/24° film is assigned 115-4 (I3A).

DX film canister barcode

For 135-film cartridges the DX number is hashed to produce a four-digit code. A suffix digit for the number of exposures and a manufacturer's proprietary prefix digit are concatenated to form a six-digit decimal code. The code is printed in human-readable text and also represented as an Interleaved 2 of 5 barcode. Size and position conform to the ANSI/NAPM IT1.14:1994 standard.

To generate digits 2 through 5, the combination code is multiplied by 16 and added to the specifier number. The result is prefixed with zeroes to make four digits. For the Agfa film 115-4 above, the digits would be 1844 (16 × 115 + 4).

Digit 1 is any digit from 0 to 9 and is assigned by the manufacturer.

Digit 6 is a code digit for the number of full-frame exposures: 1 is for 12 exposures, 2 for 20 exposures, 3 for 24, 4 for 36, 5 for 48, 6 for 60, 0 for 72 and 7 for non-standard lengths such as 24 + 3.

The barcode is located between the electrically-read silver and black DX Camera Auto-Sensing Code and the film cartridge exit lip.

The barcode is optically scanned by many film-processing machines when the cartridge is inserted for developing (Kodak patent 5761558).

DX film edge barcode
Most film produced since 1983 contains a bar code at the bottom edge, which contains both the above "DX Number Part 1" and "DX Number Part 2".  This information identifies manufacturers and chemistry associated with their various film types.  These codes are printed on the "data track" below another bar code called a "clock track".  The data track also includes a start entry pattern, frame number information, including indicating if a position is a "half-frame", a parity bit, and an exit pattern.  If the manufacturer and type of film negative is unknown, a negatives' edge bar code can be examined to identify this information.

Unlike the film canister DX number bar code, each frame or half-frame's data track code doesn't provide information about the total number of frames available in the roll.

See also
 DX encoding

References

Further reading

External links
 A database of DX numbers

Photographic film markings